Yuty is a town in the Caazapá Department of Paraguay.

Notable people 
 Gustavo Adrián Ramírez (born 1990), footballer
 Tadeo Zarratea (born 1946), lawyer, activist, linguist, and novelist

Sources 
World Gazeteer: Paraguay – World-Gazetteer.com

Populated places in the Caazapá Department